Darrell James Clarke (born 16 December 1977) is an English professional football manager and former player who played in the English Football League. He is the manager of  club Port Vale.

A box-to-box midfielder, Clarke began his career with Mansfield Town in 1995, where he spent the first six years of his career, making 173 league and cup appearances. In 2001, he transferred to Hartlepool United, where he spent another six years, making a further 136 appearances. He was sent out on loan to Stockport County, Port Vale, and Rochdale in the final years of his spell. In 2007, he left the professional game to sign for Salisbury City, before taking up the management position at the club in 2010. He led the club to promotion into the Conference Premier from the Southern League with two play-off final victories in three seasons.

He was appointed manager of Bristol Rovers in March 2014, but could not prevent the club from dropping out of the English Football League. However, one year later, Clarke successfully guided Bristol Rovers back into the Football League after winning the 2015 Conference Premier play-off Final, and then went on to take the club into League One with promotion out of League Two in 2015–16. At the time of his departure in December 2018, he was the fourth-longest serving manager in the EFL. He was appointed manager at Walsall in May 2019 and left the club in February 2021 to manage League Two rivals Port Vale. He led the club to promotion with victory in the 2022 play-off final.

Early and personal life
Born in Mansfield, Nottinghamshire, Clarke stated that he was "brought up on a rough estate". His mother died in a car crash when Clarke was aged two and he and his brother, Wayne, were raised by his grandparents as his father was an alcoholic. His grandfather was a steward at Mansfield Town.

Playing career

Mansfield Town
Clarke was an energetic box-to-box midfielder who had an eye for goal, though defending was his weakness. He started his career at Mansfield Town when he joined their youth set up at the age of just 10. He made his way through the ranks and was offered a professional contract at Field Mill by Andy King in 1995. Clarke made his first-team debut on 21 December 1996, coming on as a half-time substitute for Ben Sedgemore in a 2–1 defeat at Cardiff City. He marked his home debut at Field Mill with a goal in a 2–0 victory over Doncaster Rovers. The "Stags" struggled near the foot of the Third Division in 1995–96, rising to mid-table in 1996–97 and 1997–98, before finishing one place outside the play-offs in 1998–99. They then dropped back into the lower half of the table in 1999–2000 and 2000–01 after manager Steve Parkin was replaced by Bill Dearden. While at Mansfield he became a fan favourite, due in part to his high work-rate; he made 173 league and cup appearances for the club, scoring 27 goals.

Hartlepool United
Clarke was signed to Hartlepool United by Chris Turner in July 2001 on a free transfer, courtesy of the Bosman ruling, but Hartlepool still had to pay £70,000 as he was under 24. He was seen by many as the replacement for Tommy Miller. Clarke originally failed to cement his place in the starting 11 and found himself in and out of the team, making 26 league starts and 9 substitute appearances. However, he still managed to score seven league goals, including a hat-trick in a 7–1 win over Swansea City. The following season was much more successful for Clarke as he played in nearly all of Hartlepool's matches and added another seven goals to his tally in Hartlepool's promotion winning campaign. The arrival of manager Neale Cooper saw Clarke's opportunities in the first team in 2003–04 limited, as Eifion Williams was preferred on the right wing. Clarke only started 23 league matches, but he still managed to make a further 12 substitute appearances.

In the 2004–05 season, Clarke suffered a knee injury that prevented him from taking part in any of Hartlepool's league games. He was loaned out to Stockport County — managed by former Hartlepool boss Chris Turner — in order to gain fitness in January, but this was cut short as Clarke picked up another knee problem after just one game. His knee injury caused him to miss the second half of the campaign. In September 2005 Clarke was loaned to Port Vale, but played just two minutes after being utilised as a late substitute by manager Martin Foyle. Despite his return to full fitness being described by manager Martin Scott as a 'massive boost', his appearances were again limited once he returned to Victoria Park. In July 2006 he was loaned to Rochdale, where he made 12 appearances, scoring one goal. He was released by Hartlepool manager Danny Wilson in May 2007.

Salisbury City
On 3 July 2007 he signed for newly promoted Conference Premier club Salisbury City. He was strongly influenced by former teammate Tommy Widdrington to make the switch south, and was the third signing made by Nick Holmes. He helped the club avoid relegation in the 2008–09 season, which was a good achievement for the club. At the beginning of the 2009–10 season he became Salisbury's most senior player and was duly given the captain's armband by Widdrington, who had recently been appointed manager. He captained the club to a mid-table finish, however, Salisbury were demoted down into the Southern League Premier Division as punishment for their severe financial problems. He also spent his spare time coaching the under-8s at Portsmouth.

Management career

Salisbury City
In July 2010, Tommy Widdrington left Salisbury City for the job of assistant manager at Southend United. As a result of this, Clarke became joint caretaker manager beside Mikey Harris. The next month he was made player-manager on a permanent basis, with Harris as his assistant. He needed to secure an immediate promotion in order to maintain the funding to keep the club a full-time professional organisation and so recruited young players freshly released from Football League clubs. However he lost top-scorer Matt Tubbs, who was sold for a club record £55,000 to Crawley Town. After his first season, the "Whites" won promotion from the Southern League Premier Division via the play-offs, winning 3–2 on penalties after a 2–2 draw with Hednesford Town.

Clarke led Salisbury to the Second Round of the FA Trophy in his second season in charge. He also made history when his side beat Grimsby Town in the FA Cup Second Round, taking Salisbury to the Third Round of the FA Cup for the first time in the club's history, where they faced Sheffield United at Bramall Lane. At the start of the campaign he had stated his intention to sign promising young players, and during the January transfer window he signed 19-year-old Matt Clark and former England youth player Abdulai Bell-Baggie, as well as 29-year-old striker Robbie Matthews. However, he also placed winger Charlie Knight on the transfer list along with striker Jake Reid, defender Josh Casey, and winger Adam Kelly. They finished the 2011–12 campaign comfortably in tenth place, and Clarke extended his contract at the club to another season.

Clarke's pre-season signings for 2012–13 included Jamie White from Winchester City, James Clarke from Oxford City, and Theo Lewis after his release from Cheltenham Town. These signings proved successful, and helped to take Salisbury into second place in the Conference South by April. The team's success saw him strongly linked with the vacant management position at Hartlepool United in October 2012, though he ultimately remained at Salisbury. The club finished four points behind champions Welling United, and had to make do with a play-off place. Promotion was secured with a 3–2 extra-time victory over Dover Athletic in the play-off final.

Bristol Rovers

In June 2013, Clarke was appointed as assistant manager of League Two club Bristol Rovers, supporting John Ward. Following another season of struggle at Rovers, Ward was moved to a role as Director of football and was replaced as manager by Clarke in March 2014. His first game on 29 March ended with a 1–0 victory over Morecambe at the Memorial Stadium, and Clarke said that "I tried to get my philosophy across today and I think we did it in spells and we need to more of that". Rovers were relegated out of the Football League on the final day of the 2013–14 after a 1–0 defeat to Mansfield Town; a draw would have been enough to keep the club up, as they were relegated on goal difference.

He oversaw a rapid turnover of players for the 2014–15 season, releasing 16 players and signing 13 players on free transfers, including striker Matty Taylor. His first task however was to remove ‘Clarke Out’ posters that had been placed around the training ground by disgruntled fans. After a poor start Rovers rose up the table and ended the campaign in second place, one point behind Barnet. Clarke led Rovers to promotion with a 5–3 penalty shoot-out victory over Grimsby Town at Wembley Stadium in the 2015 Conference Premier play-off Final on 17 May 2015, following a 1–1 draw after extra time. He won three Manager of the Month awards during the season, in September, December and February. Rovers achieved a second successive promotion with a third-place finish in League Two in the 2015–16 campaign. Clarke was named as Manager of the Month for March after winning six of seven games by "playing exciting and attacking football" according to head judge George Burley. Promotion was achieved on the final day of the season with a stoppage-time winner against Dagenham & Redbridge, which took them above Accrington Stanley into third place. Named as the Football League manager of the week, his citation stated that "Clarke has performed wonders as his men have stormed up the table". On 27 May 2016, Clarke turned down the opportunity to manage Championship club Leeds United and signed a new three-year contract with Bristol Rovers. He had met Leeds chairman Massimo Cellino but rejected the opportunity after Cellino told him he wanted an active role in player recruitment.

Speaking after an FA Cup second round defeat to National League side Barrow in December 2016, Clarke said it might be the "end of the road" for some of his squad and urged investment in the playing squad. He was named as EFL manager of the week after overseeing a 5–0 victory over Northampton Town on 7 January. However that month he lost Matty Taylor after Bristol City activated his £300,000 release clause to make Taylor the first player to move from Rovers to City in 30 years. During late March 2017, with his club sitting just outside the League One play off places, Norwich City were reported to be interested in Clarke following the sacking of previous manager Alex Neil. Whilst Clarke never turned down any potential offer he instead pledged his loyalty to Rovers instead, the announcement coming a day after his three-year anniversary of his first Rovers match in charge. Rovers finished in 10th-place in 2016–17.

In June 2017, Clarke signed a new five-year contract. He was named as EFL manager of the week after overseeing a 6–0 win away at Northampton Town on 7 October despite missing his preferred centre-backs. However speaking later in December he said he felt "let down" by the club for its wage policy and infrastructure, saying they were "30 years behind" other clubs. He further admitted some of his players were struggling with the increased expectations following recent successes, though Rovers still managed to end the 2017–18 campaign in 13th-place. Billy Bodin was sold to Preston North End for an undisclosed fee in January 2018. In June 2018 he graduated with the FA's highest coaching qualification (FA Level 5 UEFA Pro). The following month he sold forward Ellis Harrison to Ipswich Town for an undisclosed fee believed to be in the region of £750,000. He left his post on 13 December 2018 following a run of seven defeats in ten matches; at the time of his departure he was the fourth-longest serving manager in the EFL.

Walsall

On 10 May 2019, Clarke signing a three-year contract to become Walsall's new manager following their relegation into League Two at the end of the 2018–19 season. He signed 16 players as 23 departed – including midfielder George Dobson, who was sold on to Sunderland – and got off to a poor start after Walsall picked up just one win the opening ten games of the 2019–20 campaign, with the team sound defensively but failing to create any chances in a 5–3–2 formation. Form improved as Clarke switched to a 4–4–2 formation and got the best out of 22-year old Wes McDonald, however a run of six league defeats began in October and drew the club into a relegation battle, though was immediately followed by a run of only two defeats in 11 league games. Walsall were in mid-table when the season was ended early due to the COVID-19 pandemic in England and Walsall Supporters’ Trust secretary Steve Davies said that the team were "starting to gel and the signing of Wes McDonald was key". Clarke went on to admit that the following campaign would likely see him focus more on youth as the club faced a challenging financial future due to the effects of the pandemic. He left the Bescot Stadium midway through the 2020–21 season with Walsall 11th in the table after Port Vale agreed to pay Walsall a compensation package.

Port Vale

On 15 February 2021, Clarke was appointed as manager of Port Vale, who were 18th in League Two and without a permanent manager since the departure of John Askey at the start of January. He arrived a week after David Flitcroft's appointment as director of football. It took him eight games to get his first win as Vale manager, which came in a 2–1 victory over Newport County on 16 March at Vale Park. This was the first of six successive victories, the longest winning streak for the club since March 1996. He was nominated for the League Two Manager of the Month award after his team picked up 16 out of an available 18 points in April, conceding just a single goal in the process. Port Vale ended the 2020–21 season in 13th-place and Clarke said that "I can’t wait to get rid of the deadwood if I am honest". He released all 15 out of contract players and placed a further three contracted players on the transfer-list.

Clarke and Flitcroft recruited 12 players for the start of the 2021–22 season, including Ben Garrity, Jamie Proctor and James Wilson. Clarke was named as September's Manager of the Month award after overseeing a run of three wins from four games which took his side into the automatic promotion places. He also won October's award after Vale secured a further 13 points, during which time they scored at least three goals in five of their six games; in doing so he became the first Port Vale boss to win the award two months running. Nine players left the club in the January transfer window, whilst eight signings were made, including Connor Hall and Chris Hussey. 

On 15 February, Clarke took a period of leave after a close family bereavement, with Andy Crosby standing in during his absence. On 30 March, it was confirmed that Clarke would be returning to the club to support Crosby until the end of the season before taking charge again in the summer. Clarke completed a phased return to the manager role on 6 May. Vale qualified for the play-off semi-finals and Clarke was sent off in extra-time of the second leg for an altercation with Swindon Town's Dion Conroy, and had to witness Vale's penalty shoot-out victory from the stands. He apologised for his behaviour and went on to say that: "We've got one more game to go against Mansfield, which is fitting because it's where my eldest daughter came from.... it'll be an emotional day but I'm looking forward to the final." He signed a new five-year contract two days before the final. Vale eased to victory in the final with a 3–0 victory and Clarke dedicated the win to his daughter, Ellie, who had died in February. Clarke was one of eleven managers who received special recognition at the 41st Football Writers Awards dinner for their work during the 2021–22 season.

Clarke was linked with the vacant management position at Portsmouth in January 2023, though stated that "I am really happy here [at Port Vale]".

Management style
Clarke is flexible with his formations and is open to different styles of playing rather than sticking to a rigid philosophy, believing that "adaptability is key". He does though have a preference for playing with two strikers. He is known for his intense training sessions and for producing extremely detailed reports on opposition teams. At Bristol Rovers his team played an attacking, passing style and scored an average of close to two goals per game. A motivational manager, he sees a happy dressing room as an essential part of a winning team and has been described as having a bubbly and infectious personality, though has been quoted as saying "I'm not a cuddling manager... soft players don't win you promotions". His personality traits make him an energetic, passionate and frank manager. He prefers to maintain a big squad of players and to regularly rotate his starting line-ups.

Career statistics

As a player

As a manager

Honours

As a player
Hartlepool United
Football League Third Division second-place promotion: 2002–03

As a player-manager
Salisbury City
Southern Football League Premier Division play-offs: 2011
Conference South play-offs: 2013

As a manager
Bristol Rovers
Conference Premier play-offs: 2015
Football League Two third-place promotion: 2015–16

Port Vale
EFL League Two play-offs: 2022

Individual
Conference Premier Manager of the Month: September 2014, December 2014, February 2015
EFL League Two Manager of the Month: March 2016, September 2021, October 2021

References

Notes 

1977 births
Living people
Footballers from Mansfield
English footballers
Association football midfielders
Mansfield Town F.C. players
Hartlepool United F.C. players
Stockport County F.C. players
Port Vale F.C. players
Rochdale A.F.C. players
Salisbury City F.C. players
English Football League players
National League (English football) players
Southern Football League players
Association football player-managers
English football managers
Salisbury City F.C. managers
Bristol Rovers F.C. managers
Walsall F.C. managers
Port Vale F.C. managers
Southern Football League managers
National League (English football) managers
English Football League managers
Association football coaches
Portsmouth F.C. non-playing staff
Bristol Rovers F.C. non-playing staff